The Last Days of New Paris is a 2016 fantasy novella by China Miéville. The book takes place in an alternate history in which surrealist artists join partisans in Paris to fight Nazi groups. The role of surrealism in history is explored.

Synopsis 
The main plot follows Thibaut, a Parisian, in an alternate-history 1950 where World War II is still ongoing and Paris is still occupied by Nazis. He joins forces with Sam, a photographer, to fight the occupying Nazis in a landscape dominated by manifs, real-world manifestations of surrealist art.

Interstitial chapters follow an America engineer & occultist named Jack Parsons, who visits a group of Marseilles surrealists, including André Breton, in 1941. Parsons creates the “S-Bomb”, the device which creates the manifs when stolen and detonated in Paris.

References

2016 British novels
British novellas
Works by China Miéville
Novels set in Paris
Del Rey books